The Mask and Bauble Dramatic Society of Georgetown University is the oldest continuously running collegiate theatre troupe in the United States. Today, the Society is one of five theatre groups on the Georgetown campus and is entirely student-run. The group continues to provide an opportunity for students to develop artistic, technical, and administrative skills, while performing high-quality theatre in its 170th season.

Mask and Bauble produces four main stage shows annually, including the Donn B. Murphy One Acts Festival, which focuses on student-written work. All shows are directed, produced, designed, and performed by students.

History
Mask and Bauble was founded in 1852 as The Dramatic Association of Georgetown College, staging its first show, Pizarro, a play by Richard Brinsley Sheridan, on February 27, 1853. World War I priorities caused a suspension of its performances, and after the war the group was revived with the new name of Mask and Bauble. The society was the first of its kind to use female actresses in 1922, as female roles were previously filled by male actors. It formally accepted female members in 1934.

During this time the Society had a close relationship with the Roosevelt White House, with Eleanor Roosevelt as a society patron. During the Eisenhower and Kennedy administrations,   student technicians from the group assisted with the technical aspects of some of the nation's first televised presidential press conferences. This intimate relationship with the White House was nurtured by the society's faculty adviser, Donn B. Murphy, who also served as theatrical adviser to Kennedy and Johnson. Murphy served until 1976, although he remains involved with Georgetown theatre. The Society's annual playwright contest and one acts festival bears his name, and promotes student-written plays.

Today 
Mask and Bauble  performs in Poulton Hall's Stage Three, on the Georgetown campus. This theater space, part of the university, was occupied by  students from the group over spring break in 1975. Unsatisfied  with university commitment to theater, they squatted in what was previously Room 57, and built a makeshift theater they named Stage Two.  The university forced this to be taken down, but built the group a small theater in Poulton Hall, which became Stage Three. Stage One was then converted into the scene and costume shop. While the club's alumni were very active in raising money to build Georgetown's new Davis Performing Arts Center, the society and other student groups have been restricted from using the center's main theatre due to their insistence on maintaining student, rather than faculty, direction. In 2009, Mask & Bauble co-produced Caroline, or Change with the Black Theater Ensemble and the Department of Performing Arts on the main stage of the Davis center, making it the first student directed play on the Gonda Stage.

Club membership currently stands over 100 students, surpassing Nomadic Theatre, one of the other theatre organizations on campus.

Production History
2022-2023 (171)
Night of Musical Scenes 
Love's Labour's Lost by William Shakespeare
DBMOAF
Into the Woods by James Lapine and Stephen Sondheim

2021-2022 (170)
Machinal by Sophie Treadwell
Beyond the Lights (In collaboration with Black Theatre Ensemble)
Violet by Jeanine Tesori and Brian Crawley
DBMOAF: featuring Grand Courses by Nick Giotis, Duty Free As A Way of Coping by Anjali Britto, and Huelga by Catherine Shonack

2020-2021 (169)
Antigone by Gilbert Murray
DBMOAF: featuring The Ponderosa by Isaac Warren
Man of La Mancha by Dale Wasserman, Mitch Leigh, and Joe Darion

2019-2020 (168)
J.B. by Archibald MacLeish
DBMOAF: featuring Marblehead, MA by Amelia Walsh
Hedda Gabler by Patrick Marber

2018-2019 (167)
DBMOAF: featuring Four Lemons and a Funeral by Allison Lane and Hazel & Stanley by Timmy Sutton
A Midsummer Night's Dream by William Shakespeare
Speech & Debate by Stephen Karam (In collaboration with Georgetown University Department of Performing Arts)
Hello Again by Michael John LaChiusa

2017-2018 (166)
Rumors by Neil Simon
DBMOAF: featuring Roots by Devika Ranjan
Mr. Burns, a Post-Electric Play by Anne Washburn (In collaboration with Nomadic Theatre)
Footloose by Tom Snow, Dean Pitchford, and Walter Bobbie

2016-2017 (165)
An American Daughter by Wendy Wasserstein (In collaboration with The Black Theatre Ensemble)
Wind Me Up, Maria!: A Go-Go Musical by Natsu Onoda Power and Charles "Shorty Corleone" Garris (In collaboration with Georgetown University Department of Performing Arts and The Black Theater Ensemble)
DBMOAF: featuring Victimology by Rachel Linton and The Gun by Grayson Ullman
Stupid Fucking Bird by Aaron Posner

2015-2016 (164)
All My Sons by Arthur Miller
DBMOAF: featuring Beyond
Cyrano by Aaron Posner and Michael Hollinger
Into the Woods by Stephen Sondheim and James Lapine

2014-2015 (163)
Inherit the Wind by Jerome Lawrence and Robert Edwin Lee
DBMOAF: featuring Sonder
Killer Joe by Tracy Letts (in collaboration with Nomadic Theatre)
Urinetown by Mark Hollmann and Greg Kotis

2013-2014 (162)
Don't Drink the Water by Woody Allen
DBMOAF: featuring How To Succeed With Dolls by Tim Lyons
Proof by David Auburn
She Loves Me by Jerry Bock, Sheldon Harnick, and Joe Masteroff

2012-2013 (161)
The History Boys by Alan Bennett
DBMOAF: featuring Spiritual Ecstasies
Polk Street by T. Chase Meacham (in collaboration with Nomadic Theatre)
Spring Awakening by Duncan Sheik and Steven Sater

2011-2012 (160) 
DBMOAF: featuring Peaches and Freon and #Courage
The Deep Blue Sea by Terence Rattigan
The 25th Annual Putnam County Spelling Bee by William Finn and Rachel Sheinkin
Macbeth by William Shakespeare

2010-2011 (159)
Arsenic and Old Lace by Joseph Kesselring
DBMOAF: featuring Typhoid Fever
Sweeney Todd: The Demon Barber of Fleet Street by Stephen Sondheim and Hugh Wheeler
Rabbit Hole by David Lindsay-Abaire
Workshops: Trial of God by Elie Wiesel, and Tennessee Williams Night of Scenes

2009-2010 (158)
No Exit by Jean-Paul Sartre
Caroline, or Change by Jeanine Tesori and Tony Kushner
The Real Thing by Tom Stoppard
DBMOAF: featuring The Hypothetical Detective
The Taming of the Shrew by William Shakespeare

2008-2009 (157)
12 Angry Men
Raised in Captivity
The Foreigner
DBMOAF: featuring Witness
Jekyll and Hyde

2007-2008 (156) 
Hamlet
All in the Timing
Black Comedy
DBMOAF: featuring In the Mind of a Great Man
Cabaret

2006-2007 (155)
The Importance of Being Earnest
The Glass Menagerie
Antigone
DBMOAF: featuring McSwiggen and the Ghost
A New Brain

2005-2006 (154)
Much Ado About Nothing
The Shape of Things
The Trestle at Pope Lick Creek
DBMOAF: featuring Chemistry
Urinetown

2004-2005 (153)
Aunt Dan and Lemon
The Love of the Nightingale
Cloud 9
DBMOAF: featuring Triptych and Diamonds are a Boy’s Best Friend
Assassins

Alumni
 John Guare: American playwright, best known for The House of Blue Leaves and Six Degrees of Separation
 Eileen Brennan: American film, television, and stage actress
 John Barrymore: American stage and film actor
 Jack Hofsiss: Director, best known for The Elephant Man
 Antonin Scalia: Supreme Court Justice
 Bradley Cooper: American film and television actor

References

External links
 Official website
 Mask and Bauble Dramatic Society blog page
 Current season information
 Facebook group page

Georgetown University student organizations
Student theatre
Theatre companies in Washington, D.C.
1852 establishments in Washington, D.C.
Organizations established in 1852